Azhar is an Indian actor and television host who has appeared in Tamil language films. After making his film debut in the Tamil film Ninaithathu Yaaro (2014), he has been in films including Yenda Thalaiyila Yenna Vekkala (2018) and Saaral (2019).

Career
Azhar completed an electronic communication degree in 2007, before working in radio and television companies. He made his film debut in Ninaithathu Yaaro (2014), portraying one of the four lead roles. Azhar was then cast in the lead role of Yenda Thalaiyila Yenna Vekkala (2018), a comedy drama co-starring Sanchita Shetty, which was produced by A. R. Reihana. The film opened to negative reviews.

He later appeared in films such as Saaral (2019) and Kichi Kichi (2022).

Personal life
Azhar got married in January 2019.

Filmography

Films

References

External links

Indian film actors
Tamil actors
Living people
Actors in Tamil cinema
Year of birth missing (living people)
21st-century Indian actors